Protein tyrosine phosphatase type IVA 2 is an enzyme that in humans is encoded by the PTP4A2 gene.

The protein encoded by this gene belongs to a small class of the protein tyrosine phosphatase (PTP) family. PTPs are cell signaling molecules that play regulatory roles in a variety of cellular processes. PTPs in this class contain a protein tyrosine phosphatase catalytic domain and a characteristic C-terminal prenylation motif. 

This PTP has been shown to primarily associate with plasmic and endosomal membrane through its C-terminal prenylation. This PTP was found to interact with the beta-subunit of Rab geranylgeranyltransferase II (beta GGT II), and thus may function as a regulator of GGT II activity. 

Overexpression of this gene in mammalian cells conferred a transformed phenotype, which suggested its role in tumorigenesis. Alternatively spliced transcript variants that encode two distinct isoforms have been described.

References

Further reading